State Route 237 (SR 237) is a state highway located in Cumberland County in southern Maine, United States. The highway functions as a bypass of the towns of Gorham, Windham and Standish.

Route description

The route runs northwest, passing through the center of town and crossing over U.S. Route 202 (US 202) / SR 4. SR 237 continues northwest and crosses into the northeastern corner of Standish. The highway immediately terminates at SR 35 near Sebago Lake.  

SR 237 runs parallel to, and northeast of, SR 114 (of which SR 237 is a former alignment) over its entire length.

History
SR 237 was originally designated State Route 95 in 1946 over part of a former alignment of SR 114, which now runs parallel to the southwest. Following the designation of Interstate 95 in 1957, SR 95 became a duplicate numbering and was subsequently renumbered to SR 237.

Major intersections

See also

 List of state highways in Maine

References

External links

237
Transportation in Cumberland County, Maine